This is a list in alphabetical order of cricketers who have played in New Zealand for the Southland cricket team in either first-class cricket or the Hawke Cup. The team played eight first-class matches between 1915 and 1921, six of which were against the neighbouring Otago cricket team. They have played in the Hawke Cup since the inaugural competition in 1910–11 and were the first winners of the trophy.

The details are the player's usual name followed by the years in which he was active as a first-class player and then his name is given as it would appear on modern match scorecards. Note that many players have represented other teams besides Southland. Players in bold played first-class matches for Southland.

A
 Thomas Abercrombie (1920/21) : T. R. Abercrombie
 Gren Alabaster (1964/65–1978/79) : G. D. Alabaster
 Jack Alabaster (1954/55–1974/75) : J. C. Alabaster
 Robert Anderson (1971/72-1976/77) : R. W. Anderson

B
 Hugh Bannerman (1910/11–1914/15) : J. W. H. Bannerman
 Peter Barton (1965/66) : P. H. Barton
 Thomas Battersby (1914/15–1918/19) : T. Battersby
 Mark Billcliff (2000/01–2005/06) : M. R. Billcliff
 Thomas Bogue (1919/20–1927/28) : T. P. Bogue
 Stanley Brown (1917/18) : S. E. V. Brown
 Graham Buist (1968/69–1970/71) : G. T. Buist
 Kevin Burns (1977/78–1991/92) : K. J. Burns

C
 Robert Camm (1919/20–1920/21) : R. H. J. Camm
 William Cockroft (1914/15) : W. E. Cockroft
 Arthur Cutler (1954/55) : A. S. H. Cutler

D
 James Darragh (1919/20) : J. F. Darragh
 Garth Dawson (1977/78–2005/06) : G. J. Dawson
 David Dixon (1919/20) : D. C. Dixon
 Jack Doig (1914/15–1920/21) : J. A. Doig
 Bradleigh Donelan (1988/89–1989/90) : B. T. P. Donelan
 Alfred Driscoll (1914/15–1929/30) : A. Driscoll
 Jacob Duffy ((2011/12–2017/18) : J. A. Duffy
 Ryan Duffy (2009/10–2019/20) : R. M. Duffy
 Desmond Dunnet (1936/37) : D. M. Dunnet

F
 Robert Fogo (1914/15–1919/20) : R. H. B. Fogo
 Shaun Fitzgibbon (2005/06–2019/20) : S. M. Fitzgibbon

G
 Alan Gilbertson (1954/55–1960/61) : A. W. Gilbertson
 James Gilbertson (1910/11–1920/21) : J. Gilbertson
 John Gilbertson (1914/15–1918/19) : J. H. Gilbertson
 Jim Gill (1954/55) : J. A. Gill
 Horace Gleeson (1917/18–1920/21) : H. A. Gleeson
 Thomas Groves  (1914/15-1920/21) : T. G. Groves

H

I
 Kassem Ibadulla (1983/84–1990/91) : K. B. K. Ibadulla

J
 H. Jackson (1918/19)
 Robin Jefferson (1965/66) : R. G. Jefferson

K
 Edward Kavanagh (1910/11-1920/21) : E. J. Kavanagh
 Albert Keast (1929/30) : A. W. E. M. Keast
 Ernest Kemnitz (1914/15) : E. J. Kemnitz
 Richard King (1990/91–1992/93) : R. T. King
 George Kingston (1917/18) : G. R. Kingston
 Ronnie Kotkamp (2011/12) : R. Kotkamp

L
 Michael Lamont (1987/88–1991/92) : M. J. Lamont
 John Lindsay (1975/76–1991/92) : J. K. Lindsay
 Ben Lockrose (2016/17–2020/21) : B. N. J. Lockrose

M
 Andrew McBeath (1919/20) : A. J. McBeath
 Dan McBeath (1919/20–1920/21) : D. J. McBeath
 G. McBeath (1919/20)
 Murray McEwan (1960/61) : M. L. McEwan
 Brian McKechnie (1971/72–1986/87) : B. J. McKechnie
 Alexander Mahoney (1973/74) : A. J. Mahoney
 Evan Marshall (1989/90) : E. J. Marshall
 Peter Marshall (1981/82) : P. G. Marshall
 Geoffrey Murdoch (1972/73–1974/75) : G. H. Murdoch

O
 Kevin O'Connor (1964/65–1976/77) : K. J. O'Connor
 Geoffrey Osborne (1981/82) : G. C. Osborne
 Guy Overton (1954/55) : G. W. F. Overton
 Horace Owles (1917/18) : H. E. Owles

N
 Kenneth Nicholson (1970/71–1976/77) : K. A. Nicholson

P
 Bill Patrick (1934/35–1936/37) : W. R. Patrick
 Francis Petrie (1920/21) : F. R. S. Petrie
 Arthur Poole (1910/11–1920/21) : A. V. Poole
 Thomas Pope (1920/21) : T. R. W. Pope
 Robert Prouting (1965/66) : R. H. Prouting
 John Purdue (1938/39) : J. W. Purdue

R
 Stanley Raines (1919/20) : S. V. Raines
 William Robertson (1960/61–1968/69) : W. A. Robertson
 Phil Robinson (1987/88) : P. E. Robinson
 Robert Roy (1969/70) : R. A. Roy

S
 Jack Scandrett (1934/35–1936/37) : J. C. Scandrett
 Peter Sharp (1960/61) : P. A. Sharp
 Cliff Shirley (1954/55) : C. V. Shirley
 Craig Smith (2009/10–2015/16) : C. M. Smith
 Edward Smith (1917/18) : E. H. Smith

T
 Cecil Tapley (1914/15–1929/30) : C. B. Tapley
 Graeme Thomson (1968/69–1980/81) : G. B. Thomson
 Neale Thompson (1954/55–1978/79) : N. R. Thompson
 Peter Truscott (1960/61) : P. B. Truscott
 Nicholas Turner (2002/03–2008/09) : N. M. Turner

V
 John Vear (1960/61–1968/69) : D. J. Vear

W
 Brendan Ward (1990/91) : B. P. Ward
 Alfred Washer (1919/20) : A. J. Washer
 Jeff Wilson (1988/89–2002/03) : J. W. Wilson
 John Wilson (1977/78–1989/90) : T. J. Wilson
 S. Wilson (1917/18–1918/19)

References

Southland cricketers